In the area of mathematics known as functional analysis, a semi-reflexive space is a locally convex topological vector space (TVS) X such that the canonical evaluation map from X into its bidual (which is the strong dual of the strong dual of X) is bijective. 
If this map is also an isomorphism of TVSs then it is called reflexive. 

Semi-reflexive spaces play an important role in the general theory of locally convex TVSs. 
Since a normable TVS is semi-reflexive if and only if it is reflexive, the concept of semi-reflexivity is primarily used with TVSs that are not normable.

Definition and notation

Brief definition 

this topology is also called the strong dual topology and it is the "default" topology placed on a continuous dual space (unless another topology is specified). 

since  is necessarily continuous, it follows that . 
This map was introduced by Hans Hahn in 1927. 

We call  semireflexive if  is bijective (or equivalently, surjective) and we call  reflexive if in addition  is an isomorphism of TVSs. 
If  is a normed space then  is a TVS-embedding as well as an isometry onto its range; 
A normable space is reflexive if and only if it is semi-reflexive. 
A Banach space is reflexive if and only if its closed unit ball is -compact.

Detailed definition 

Let  be a topological vector space over a number field  (of real numbers  or complex numbers ). 
It consists of all 
continuous linear functionals  and is equipped with the strong topology . 
Each vector  generates a map  by the following formula:

One obtains a map called the evaluation map or the canonical injection:

which is a linear map. 
If  is locally convex, from the Hahn–Banach theorem it follows that  is injective and open (that is, for each neighbourhood of zero  in  there is a neighbourhood of zero  in  such that ). 
But it can be non-surjective and/or discontinuous.

A locally convex space  is called semi-reflexive if the evaluation map   is surjective (hence bijective); it is called reflexive if the evaluation map   is surjective and continuous, in which case   will be an isomorphism of TVSs).

Characterizations of semi-reflexive spaces 

If  is a Hausdorff locally convex space then the following are equivalent:
 is semireflexive;
If linear form on  that continuous when  has the strong dual topology, then it is continuous when  has the weak topology;
 weak the weak topology  is quasi-complete.

Sufficient conditions 

Every semi-Montel space is semi-reflexive and every Montel space is reflexive.

Properties 

If  is a Hausdorff locally convex space then the canonical injection from  into its bidual is a topological embedding if and only if  is infrabarrelled. 

The strong dual of a semireflexive space is barrelled.  
Every semi-reflexive space is quasi-complete.  
Every semi-reflexive normed space is a reflexive Banach space.  
The strong dual of a semireflexive space is barrelled.

Reflexive spaces 

If  is a Hausdorff locally convex space then the following are equivalent:
 is reflexive;
 is semireflexive and barrelled;
 is semireflexive and quasibarrelled.

If  is a normed space then the following are equivalent:
 is reflexive;
the closed unit ball is compact when  has the weak topology .

Examples 

Every non-reflexive infinite-dimensional Banach space is a distinguished space that is not semi-reflexive.
If  is a dense proper vector subspace of a reflexive Banach space then  is a normed space that not semi-reflexive but its strong dual space is a reflexive Banach space.
There exists a semi-reflexive countably barrelled space that is not barrelled.

See also 

 Grothendieck space - A generalization which has some of the properties of reflexive spaces and includes many spaces of practical importance.
 Reflexive operator algebra
 Reflexive space

Citations

Bibliography 

  
 
 John B. Conway, A Course in Functional Analysis, Springer, 1985.
 .
   
 
 .
  
  
  
  
  

Banach spaces
Duality theories